The Felix G. Hansford House was built in 1824 by Mr. Felix G. Hansford, president of the Giles, Fayette and Kanawha Turnpike Company.  It is the oldest building in the town of Hansford, West Virginia.

The house is listed on the National Register of Historic Places.  The house sat empty from the 90s and began falling apart. Attempts to find the owner were unfruitful.

References

Federal architecture in West Virginia
Houses completed in 1824
Houses in Kanawha County, West Virginia
Houses on the National Register of Historic Places in West Virginia
National Register of Historic Places in Kanawha County, West Virginia